Sir Guy Stephenson  (5 November 1865 – 17 October 1930) was a British barrister, Assistant Treasury Solicitor and Assistant Director of Public Prosecutions.

Biography

Stephenson was born in St George Hanover Square in London, the eldest son of Sir Augustus Keppel Stephenson (1827–1904) and his wife, Eglantine Pleydell-Bouverie, daughter of Edward Pleydell-Bouverie. He was educated at Harrow and Trinity College, Cambridge. He was called to the Bar from the Inner Temple in 1888 and practised as a barrister at the Central Criminal Court and on the South Eastern Circuit. In 1901, he was appointed as counsel to the Treasury at the North London Sessions and in 1905 Assistant Treasury Solicitor. In 1895 along with Horace Avory he was the prosecutor in the Robert Coombes murder case.

From 1908 until his death, he served as Assistant Director of Public Prosecutions.
He also was a Captain and later an Honorary Major in the 2nd Volunteer Battalion the Wiltshire Regiment.

Private life
In 1905, Stephenson married Gwendolen, a daughter of J. G. Talbot. They had four sons (including John Stephenson, a future Lord Justice of Appeal) and one daughter.

In Who's Who, he gave his recreations as shooting, fishing, and golf and his club as Brooks's. His address at the time of his death was 41 Egerton Gardens, London SW3.

Honours
Companion of the Order of the Bath, 1915
Knight Bachelor, 1923

Publication
Archbold's Criminal Pleading (joint editor of 22nd and 23rd editions)

References

1865 births
1930 deaths
Alumni of Trinity College, Cambridge
People educated at Harrow School
English prosecutors
Companions of the Order of the Bath
Knights Bachelor
Lawyers awarded knighthoods